Fusarium oxysporum f.sp. vasinfectum is a fungal plant pathogen.

External links
 Index Fungorum
 USDA ARS Fungal Database

oxysporum f.sp. vasinfectum
Fungal plant pathogens and diseases
Forma specialis taxa
Fungi described in 1892